Tower of London is a 1962 historical drama and gothic horror film directed by Roger Corman and starring Vincent Price and Michael Pate. The film was produced by Edward Small Productions.

The film tells a highly fictionalised account of the rise to power and eventual downfall of King Richard III of England, freely combining elements derived from the plots of Shakespeare's plays Richard III and Macbeth.

Aside from the historical setting, the movie is not connected to the 1939 film of the same name, starring Price, Basil Rathbone and Boris Karloff.

Plot
In 1483 England, Richard, the Duke of Gloucester (Vincent Price), is dismayed when his dying brother King Edward IV names their brother George, Duke of Clarence as Protector to his young son and heir, Prince Edward. Richard wants the position himself, to become de facto ruler after his brother's death. He secretly stabs George to death with a dagger bearing the crest of the Woodville family, framing the dying king's in-laws. Richard is now named Protector. His wife Anne approves of his crime and encourages him to take the throne for himself.

After the death of King Edward, Richard tries to achieve his ends by intimidating the widowed queen's lady-in-waiting Mistress Shore into claiming that the dead king's two children are illegitimate. She refuses, and Richard tortures her. After she dies on the rack, Richard claims he executed her for spreading the rumour that the princes were illegitimate. He says that the two princes should be placed in his protective custody.

The ghosts of Clarence, King Edward and Mistress Shore haunt Richard, warning him that they will be revenged at "Bosworth". He is also told that he will be killed by a dead man. Shore's ghost merges with the body of Anne, and a semi-deranged Richard strangles his own wife, believing her to be Shore. Without his beloved Anne, he is struck with guilt and loneliness. Richard consults the Moorish physician and sorcerer Tyrus, who shows him visions of his future, including the prophecy that he will be king.

Tyrus is disturbed by Richard's increasingly deranged demeanour. Fearful for the safety of the princes, he informs Sir Jasper, a young aristocrat who is looking after the lads. Jasper plots with his girlfriend, Lady Margaret Stanley, to rescue the princes. He manages to get the young Duke of York and his mother free, but he is trapped and captured with the child-king Edward. Lady Margaret, who has been sent to get aid from her father Lord Stanley, is also captured and imprisoned.

Richard spares Jasper, because he needs him to negotiate with Stanley, who is withholding his support for the Protector. Richard forces the Archbishop to give up the Duke of York, who has sought church sanctuary in Westminster Abbey with his mother. Aided by his crony, Sir Ratcliffe, Richard then murders the two princes in their beds and proclaims himself king.

The ghosts of the princes try to lure Richard to his death from the battlements of the Tower, but he is saved by Buckingham. Buckingham confides in Ratcliffe his doubts about Richard's sanity, suggesting that they should join Lord Stanley. Ratcliffe informs Richard, who has Buckingham tortured to death. Meanwhile, Tyrus helps Jasper to rescue Margaret, but is mortally wounded during the escape. Jasper and Margaret join Stanley to encourage him to topple Richard from the throne.

Richard is crowned, but is still haunted by fear. Ratcliffe informs him that Stanley has marched to the village of Bosworth with an army. Richard declares that he will fight. When Ratcliffe learns that Stanley has been joined by the Earl of Richmond, he advises Richard to flee, but the king is convinced of his invincibility. At the Battle of Bosworth Field Richard is eventually left alone on the battlefield after his army has been defeated. The ghosts of his victims appear, and he attempts to fight them. Jasper, Stanley and Richmond watch as Richard swipes at thin air. The king attempts to mount a horse, but is thrown and killed by a battleaxe held by a dead soldier.

Cast
Vincent Price as Richard, Duke of Gloucester
Michael Pate as Sir Richard Ratcliffe
Joan Freeman as Lady Margaret Stanley
Robert Brown as Sir Justin
Bruce Gordon as the Earl of Buckingham
Joan Camden as Anne Neville, Duchess of Gloucester
Richard Hale as Tyrus the physician
Sandra Knight as Mistress Shore
Charles Macaulay as the Duke of Clarence
Justice Watson as Edward IV
Sarah Selby as The Queen
Donald Losby as Prince Richard
Sara Taft as Richard's mother, the Duchess of York
Eugene Mazzola as Edward V
Morris Ankrum as The Archbishop (uncredited)
Paul Frees as Opening Narrator (voice) (uncredited)
Gene Roth as The Tailor (uncredited)
Jack Tornek as Member of Court (uncredited)

Production

Development
In February 1961 it was announced Roger Corman had signed a "multi-picture pact" with Edward Small to make films for United Artists starting with The Intruder.

Corman ended up producing The Intruder without Small but they made Tower of London together. Corman says Small had been impressed by Corman's Edgar Allan Poe adaptations with Vincent Price and approached him with the idea of making a story about Richard III. According to Corman's brother Gene, who co-produced the film, the idea came from him and writer Leo Gordon. They were trying to come up with a fresh take on the Poe picture; they considered Nathaniel Hawthorne "and three or four other ideas" before deciding on William Shakespeare; Macbeth was not ideal but Richard III was. "We were exploring the same genre, but a different author," says Gene Corman.

The film was known as To Dream of Kings. Price's signing was announced in December 1961.

Shooting
Filming started in March 1962 in London. The film was shot in fifteen days. Francis Ford Coppola worked on it as dialogue director. Gene Corman says the main cost was the sets, built at the old Producer's Studio. Gene Corman says the decision to shoot the film in black and white came from Eddie Small due to cost reasons; Small only informed them of this shortly before shooting, leading to a big argument between Roger Corman and Small. Gene Corman says "what Eddie obviously decided was that Vincent Price had a built-in audience and they would not realise up front that they were buying a black and white Price film. They'd take it for granted that this was in colour."

The movie was meant to be the first of a three-picture contract between Corman and Small. Corman later called the movie:
The most foolish thing I’ve ever filmed. Every night he [Small] would come to see me or call me. The script was changed, reworked without my consent. Lots of strange things were happening all the time, and finally I asked him to tear up our contract. He realized he wouldn’t get anything worthwhile out of me and tore it up. I have nothing against Eddie Small. He’s an old man who had lots of success during the thirties, and who doesn’t know that times have changed.

Reception
Reviews were mixed.

Box Office
Gene Corman says "I kind of liked that film and I know Vincent was always pleased with that performance." He says the movie "opened big – for that kind of film – but the down-the-line play was not what it should have been, because at that point the distributor knew he didn't have a colour film."

See also
 List of American films of 1962
List of historical drama films

References

Notes

External links 

 
 
 
Tower of London at Letterbox DVD

1962 films
1962 horror films
1960s English-language films
1960s historical horror films
American historical horror films
American black-and-white films
Films directed by Roger Corman
Films based on Macbeth
Films based on Richard III (play)
Films based on multiple works
Films set in the 1480s
Films set in London
Films set in England
Films shot in London
United Artists films
Films produced by Edward Small
Tower of London
1960s American films